Lula Galvão (born Luiz Guilherme Farias Galvão in 1962) is a Brazilian guitarist and arranger. He has worked with musicians including Caetano Veloso, Guinga, Rosa Passos, Leila Pinheiro Rosa Passos, Ivan Lins and Cláudio Roditi.

Career
He began his career in Brasília, Federal District with singer Rosa Passos and later worked as an arranger and performer on several of her several albums. He performed with Ivan Lins at concerts in the United States (Hollywood Bowl, Blue Note Jazz Club, San Francisco Jazz Festival, Clifford Brown Jazz Festival) and in Japan. With Guinga he performed at the Festival of the Guitar (Córdoba, Spain), with the Los Angeles Philharmonic (Disney Hall) with Vince Mendoza, John F. Kennedy Center for the Performing Arts (Washington D.C.), Spivey Hall (Georgia), HotHouse jazz club (Chicago), with Rosa Passos at the jazz festival in Berne, Switzerland, and with cellist Jaques Morelenbaum in Europe. He has also performed with Helio Alves, Paquito D'Rivera, Claudio Roditi, and Raul de Souza. He has recorded with Chico Buarque, Chano Dominguez, Frank Gambale, Leila Pinheiro, Kenny Rankin, Henri Salvador, and Wagner Tiso. In Guitar Player magazine of Brazil, he was voted one of the ten most popular guitarists in Brazil.

Discography

As leader
 2009 Bossa da Minha Terra (Groovin' High)

As sideman
With Joyce
 1999 Hard Bossa 
 2007 Samba Jazz & Outras Bossas with Tutty Moreno
 2009 Slow Music

With Rosa Passos
 1996 Pano Pra Manga 
 1993 Festa
 2003 Entre Amigos with Ron Carter (Chesky)
 2008 Romance

With others
 1996 Claudio, Rio & Friends, Claudio Roditi
 1997 Here in My Heart, Kenny Rankin (Private Music)
 1999 Suite Leopoldina, Guinga
 2001 Macale Canta Moreira, Jards Macalé
 2001 Rio,  Uri Caine (Winter & Winter)
 2004 A Foreign Sound, Caetano Veloso
 2004 O Doutor Do Baiao, Humberto Teixeira
 2006 Révérence, Henri Salvador
 2008 Celebrating Our Time to Remember, Thiago de Mello
 2012 Kenny Barron & the Brazilian Knights, Kenny Barron (Sunnyside)
 2022 Quietude, Eliane Elias (Candid)

References 

Latin jazz musicians
Brazilian jazz guitarists
Música Popular Brasileira guitarists
People from Brasília
1962 births
Living people